Ahsan Hafeez Bhatti (born 30 March 1998) is a Pakistani cricketer. He made his List A debut for National Bank of Pakistan in the 2016–17 Departmental One Day Cup on 17 December 2016. He made his first-class debut for Federally Administered Tribal Areas in the 2017–18 Quaid-e-Azam Trophy on 15 October 2017.

References

External links
 
 Ahsan Hafeez Bhatti at Pakistan Cricket Board

1998 births
Living people
Pakistani cricketers
Federally Administered Tribal Areas cricketers
National Bank of Pakistan cricketers
Cricketers from Sheikhupura